Jewish Bolshevism, also Judeo–Bolshevism, is an anti-communist and antisemitic canard, which alleges that the Jews were the originators of the Russian Revolution in 1917, and that they held primary power among the Bolsheviks who led the revolution. Similarly, the conspiracy theory of Jewish Communism  alleges that Jews have dominated the Communist movements in the world, and is related to the Zionist Occupation Government conspiracy theory (ZOG), which alleges that Jews control world politics.

In 1917, after the Russian Revolution, the antisemitic canard was the title of the pamphlet The Jewish Bolshevism, which featured in the racist propaganda of the anti-communist White movement forces during the Russian Civil War (1918–1922). During the 1930s, the Nazi Party in Germany and the German American Bund in the United States propagated the antisemitic theory to their followers, sympathisers, and fellow travellers. In Poland, Żydokomuna was a term for the antisemitic opinion that the Jews had a disproportionately high influence in the administration of Communist Poland. In far-right politics, the antisemitic canards of "Jewish Bolshevism", "Jewish Communism", and the ZOG conspiracy theory are catchwords falsely asserting that Communism is a Jewish conspiracy.

Origins

The conflation of Jews and revolution emerged in the atmosphere of destruction of Russia during World War I. When the revolutions of 1917 crippled Russia's war effort, conspiracy theories developed far from Berlin and Petrograd. Some commentators in Britain ascribed the revolution to an "apparent conjunction of Bolsheviks, Germans and Jews". By December 1917, five of the twenty-one members of the Communist Central Committee were Jews: the commissar for foreign affairs, the president of the Supreme Soviet, the deputy chairman of the Council of People's Commissars, the president of Petrograd Soviet, and the deputy director of the Cheka secret police.
   
The worldwide spread of the concept in the 1920s is associated with the publication and circulation of The Protocols of the Elders of Zion, a fraudulent document that purported to describe a secret Jewish conspiracy aimed at world domination. The expression made an issue out of the Jewishness of some leading Bolsheviks (such as Leon Trotsky) during and after the October Revolution. Daniel Pipes said that "primarily through The Protocols of the Elders of Zion, the Whites spread these charges to an international audience." James Webb wrote that it is rare to find an antisemitic source after 1917 that "does not stand in debt to the White Russian analysis of the Revolution".

Jewish involvement in Russian Communism

Antisemitism in the Russian Empire existed both culturally and institutionally. The Jews were restricted to live within the Pale of Settlement, and suffered pogroms.

As a result, many Jews supported gradual or revolutionary changes within the Russian Empire. Those movements ranged among the far left (Jewish Anarchism, Bundists, Bolsheviks, Mensheviks,) and moderate left (Trudoviks) and constitutionalist (Constitutional Democrats) parties. According to the 1922 Bolshevik party census, there were 19,564 Jewish Bolsheviks, comprising 5.21% of the total, and in the 1920s of the 417 members of the Central Executive Committee, the party Central Committee, the Presidium of the Executive of the Soviets of the USSR and the Russian Republic, the People's Commissars, 6% were ethnic Jews. Between 1936 and 1940, during the Great Purge, Yezhovshchina and after the rapprochement with Nazi Germany, Stalin had largely eliminated Jews from senior party, government, diplomatic, security and military positions.

Some scholars have grossly exaggerated Jewish presence in the Soviet Communist Party. For example, Alfred Jensen said that in the 1920s "75 per cent of the leading Bolsheviks" were "of Jewish origin". According to Aaronovitch, "a cursory examination of membership of the top committees shows this figure to be an absurd exaggeration".
In 2013, speaking about the Schneerson Collection at the Moscow Jewish Museum and the Center for Tolerance, Russian President Vladimir Putin erroneously noted that "The decision to nationalize the library was made by the first Soviet government, and Jews were approximately 80–85% members". According to historian Vladimir Ryzhkov, Putin's ignorant statement about the predominance of Jews in the Council of People's Commissars is due to the fact that "during the years of perestroika, he read the tabloid press". Some media outlets also criticized the statements of the President of the Russian Federation. So the editors of the newspaper Vedomosti, condemning the head of state for marginality, posted the following statistics:"If we discard the speculations of pseudoscientists who know how to find the Jewish origin of every revolutionary, it turns out that in the first composition of the Council of People's Commissars of Jews there were 8%: of its 16 members, only Leon Trotsky was a Jew. In the government of the Russian Socialist Federative Soviet Republic of 1917–1922 Jews were 12% (six out of 50 people). Apart from the government, the Central Committee of the Russian Social Democratic Labour Party (Bolsheviks) on the eve of October 1917 had 20% Jews (6 out of 30), and in the first composition of the political bureau of the Central Committee of the Russian Communist Party (Bolsheviks) – 40% (3 out of 7)".— Vedomosti (dated 17 June 2013).

Nazi Germany

Walter Laqueur traces the Jewish-Bolshevik conspiracy theory to Nazi ideologue Alfred Rosenberg, for whom Bolshevism was "the revolt of the Jewish, Slavic and Mongolian races against the German (Aryan) element in Russia". Germans, according to Rosenberg, had been responsible for Russia's historic achievements and had been sidelined by the Bolsheviks, who did not represent the interests of the Russian people, but instead those of its ethnic Jewish and Chinese population.

Michael Kellogg, in his Ph.D. thesis, argues that the racist ideology of Nazis was to a significant extent influenced by White émigrés in Germany, many of whom, while being former subjects of the Russian Empire, were of non-Russian descent: ethnic Germans, residents of Baltic lands including Baltic Germans, and Ukrainians. Of particular role was their Aufbau organization (Aufbau: Wirtschafts-politische Vereinigung für den Osten (Reconstruction: Economic-Political Organization for the East)). For example, its leader was instrumental in making The Protocols of The Elders of Zion available in German language. He argues that early Hitler was rather philosemitic, and became rabidly antisemitic after 1919 under the influence of the White émigré convictions about the conspiracy of the Jews, an unseen unity from financial capitalists to Bolsheviks, to conquer the world. Therefore, his conclusion is that White émigrés were at the source of the Nazi concept of Jewish Bolshevism. Annemarie Sammartino argues that this view is contestable. While there is no doubt that White emigres were instrumental in reinforcing the idea of 'Jewish Bolshevism' among Nazis, the concept is also found in many German early post–World War I documents. Also, Germany had its own share of Jewish Communists "to provide fodder for the paranoid fantasies of German antisemites" without Russian Bolsheviks.

During the 1920s, Hitler declared that the mission of the Nazi movement was to destroy "Jewish Bolshevism". Hitler asserted that the "three vices" of "Jewish Marxism" were democracy, pacifism and internationalism, and that the Jews were behind Bolshevism, communism and Marxism. In private conversations held in 1940s, Hitler labelled Christianity as a Jewish product analogous to Judeo-Bolshevism: 

In Nazi Germany, this concept of Jewish Bolshevism reflected a common perception that Communism was a Jewish-inspired and Jewish-led movement seeking world domination from its origin. The term was popularized in print in German journalist Dietrich Eckhart's 1924 pamphlet "" ("Bolshevism from Moses to Lenin") which depicted Moses and Lenin as both being Communists and Jews. This was followed by Alfred Rosenberg's 1923 edition of The Protocols of the Elders of Zion and Hitler's Mein Kampf in 1925, which saw Bolshevism as "Jewry's twentieth century effort to take world dominion unto itself".

According to French spymaster and writer Henri Rollin, "Hitlerism" was based on "anti-Soviet counter-revolution" promoting the "myth of a mysterious Jewish–Masonic–Bolshevik plot", entailing that the First World War had been instigated by a vast Jewish–Masonic conspiracy to topple the Russian, German, and Austro-Hungarian Empires and implement Bolshevism by fomenting liberal ideas.

A major source for propaganda about Jewish Bolshevism in the 1930s and early 1940s was the pro-Nazi and antisemitic international Welt-Dienst news agency founded in 1933 by Ulrich Fleischhauer.

Within the German Army, a tendency to see Soviet Communism as a Jewish conspiracy had grown since the First World War, something that became officialized under the Nazis. A 1932 pamphlet by Ewald Banse of the Government-financed German National Association for the Military Sciences described the Soviet leadership as mostly Jewish, dominating an apathetic and mindless Russian population.

By the mid thirties, the Reich Ministry of Public Enlightenment and Propaganda had created a special agency called the Anti-Komintern, which was dedicated to creating anti-communist propaganda and heavily publicizing their theory of Judeo-Bolshevism.

Propaganda produced in 1935 by the psychological war laboratory of the German War Ministry described Soviet officials as "mostly filthy Jews" and called on Red Army soldiers to rise up and kill their "Jewish commissars". This material was not used at the time, but served as a basis for propaganda in the 1940s.

Nazi Propaganda Minister Joseph Goebbels speaking at the Nuremberg Party Rally in September 1935 said:

Members of the Nazi Schutzstaffel (SS) were encouraged to fight against the "Jewish Bolshevik sub-humans". In the pamphlet The SS as an Anti-Bolshevist Fighting Organization, published in 1936, Reichsführer-SS Heinrich Himmler wrote:

After Operation Barbarossa Nazi propaganda depicted the war as a "European crusade against Bolshevism" and Waffen-SS units were consisting largely or solely of foreign volunteers and conscripts.

In his speech to the Reichstag justifying Operation Barbarossa in 1941, Hitler said:

Field-Marshal Wilhelm Keitel gave an order on 12 September 1941 which declared: "the struggle against Bolshevism demands ruthless and energetic, rigorous action above all against the Jews, the main carriers of Bolshevism".

Historian Richard J. Evans wrote that Wehrmacht officers regarded the Russians as "sub-human", and were from the time of the invasion of Poland in 1939 telling their troops the war was caused by "Jewish vermin", explaining to the troops that the war against the Soviet Union was a war to wipe out what were variously described as "Jewish Bolshevik subhumans", the "Mongol hordes", the "Asiatic flood" and the "red beast", language clearly intended to produce war crimes by reducing the enemy to something less than human.

Joseph Goebbels published an article in 1942 called "the so-called Russian soul" in which he claimed that Bolshevism was exploiting the Slavs and that the battle of the Soviet Union determined whether Europe would become under complete control by international Jewry.

Nazi propaganda presented Barbarossa as an ideological-racial war between German Nazism and "Judeo-Bolshevism", dehumanising the Soviet enemy as a force of Slavic Untermensch (sub-humans) and "Asiatic" savages engaging in "barbaric Asiatic fighting methods" commanded by evil Jewish commissars whom German troops were to grant no mercy. The vast majority of the Wehrmacht officers and soldiers tended to regard the war in Nazi terms, seeing their Soviet opponents as sub-human.

Outside Nazi Germany

Great Britain, 1920s

In the early 1920s, a leading British antisemite, Henry Hamilton Beamish, stated that Bolshevism was the same thing as Judaism. In the same decade, future wartime Prime Minister Winston Churchill penned an editorial entitled "Zionism versus Bolshevism", which was published in the Illustrated Sunday Herald. In the article, which asserted that Zionism and Bolshevism were engaged in a "struggle for the soul of the Jewish people", he called on Jews to repudiate "the Bolshevik conspiracy" and make clear that "the Bolshevik movement is not a Jewish movement" but stated that:

[Bolshevism] among the Jews is nothing new. From the days of Spartacus-Weishaupt to those of Karl Marx, and down to Trotsky (Russia), Bela Kun (Hungary), Rosa Luxemburg (Germany), and Emma Goldman (United States), this world-wide conspiracy for the overthrow of civilisation and for the reconstitution of society on the basis of arrested development, of envious malevolence, and impossible equality, has been steadily growing.

Author Gisela C. Lebzelter noted that Churchill's analysis failed to analyze the role that Russian oppression of Jews had played in their joining various revolutionary movements, but instead "to inherent inclinations rooted in Jewish character and religion".

Finland
In 1919 the White Guard associated propaganda organ Church-National Enlightenment Bureau published "What is Bolshevism" targeted at former Red Guards. The book argued that communism was a Jewish plot and communist leaders were almost exclusively Jewish and Jews were a race "that has a peculiar ability to live without working at the expense of others by swindling".

In 1920 the chief of the newly established Finnish Security Police advised his personnel on how to proceed with Jews coming from Russia: “One must be very much on one’s guard, particularly with the Jews, for according to the received information, at least 80 percent of all Bolshevik leaders are thought to be Jews”.

Works propagating the Jewish Bolshevism canard

The Octopus

The Octopus is a 256-page book self-published in 1940 by Elizabeth Dilling under the pseudonym "Rev. Frank Woodruff Johnson". In it she describes her theories of Jewish Bolshevism.

Behind Communism
Frank L. Britton, editor of The American Nationalist published a book, Behind Communism, in 1952 which disseminated the myth that Communism was a Jewish conspiracy originating in Palestine.

Analysis of the Jewish Bolshevism canard
Researchers in the field, such as Polish philosopher Stanisław Krajewski or André Gerrits, denounce the concept of Jewish Bolshevism as a prejudice. Law professor Ilya Somin agrees, and compares Jewish involvement in other communist countries: "Overrepresentation of a group in a political movement does not prove either that the movement was 'dominated' by that group or that it primarily serves that group's interests. The idea that communist oppression was somehow Jewish in nature is belied by the record of communist regimes in countries like China, North Korea, and Cambodia, where the Jewish presence was and is minuscule."Several scholars have observed that Jewish involvement in Communist movements was primarily a response to antisemitism and rejection by established politics. Others note that this involvement was greatly exaggerated to accord with existing antisemitic narratives.

Philip Mendes observed this on a policy level:

See also
Cultural Bolshevism
Cultural Marxism conspiracy theory
Israeli Communist Party

References

Citations

Sources 

 
 
 
 
 
 
 Friedman, Isaiah (1997). Germany, Turkey, and Zionism 1897–1918. Transaction Publishers. 
 Fromkin, David (2009). A Peace to End All Peace: The Fall of the Ottoman Empire and the Creation of the Modern Middle East. Holt Paperbacks. .
 
 
 
 
 
 
 
 
 
 
 
 McMeekin, Sean (2012). The Berlin-Baghdad Express: The Ottoman Empire and Germany's Bid for World Power. Belknap Press.

Further reading

 Mikhail Agursky: The Third Rome: National Bolshevism in the USSR, Boulder: Westview Press, 1987 
 Harry Defries, Conservative Party Attitudes to Jews, 1900–1950 Jewish Bolshevism, p. 70, 

Johannes Rogalla von Bieberstein: '"Juedischer Bolschewismus". Mythos und Realität'. Dresden: Antaios, 2003, ; 2.ed. Graz: Ares, 2010.

 Yuri Slezkine: The Jewish Century, Princeton: Princeton University Press, 2004 
 Scott Ury, Barricades and Banners: The Revolution of 1905 and the Transformation of Warsaw Jewry (Stanford, 2012).

External links 
 

 
Anti-communism
Jews and Judaism in the Soviet Union
Propaganda legends